Trichophysetis is a genus of moths of the family Crambidae.

Species
Trichophysetis acutangulalis Hampson 1903 
Trichophysetis aurantidiscalis Caradja 1934 
Trichophysetis bipunctalis Caradja 1925 
Trichophysetis cretacea (Butler, 1879)
Trichophysetis crocoplaga Lower 1903
Trichophysetis drancesalis (Walker 1858)
Trichophysetis flavimargo (Warren, 1897)
Trichophysetis fulvifusalis Lower 1903 
Trichophysetis gracilentalis (Swinhoe, 1890)
Trichophysetis hampsoni South 1901 
Trichophysetis metamelalis Hampson 1899 
Trichophysetis microspila (Meyrick, 1894)
Trichophysetis neophyla (Meyrick, 1884)
Trichophysetis nesias (Meyrick, 1886)
Trichophysetis nigricincta (Hampson 1893)
Trichophysetis nigridiscalis Warren 1895 
Trichophysetis nigripalpis Warren 1896 
Trichophysetis obnubilalis (Christoph 1881)
Trichophysetis poliochyta Turner 1911 
Trichophysetis preciosalis Guillermet 1996 
Trichophysetis pygmaealis Warren 1896 
Trichophysetis rufoterminalis (Christoph, 1881)
Trichophysetis umbrifusalis Hampson 1912
Trichophysetis whitei Rebel, 1906

References

Encyclopedia of Life

Cybalomiinae
Crambidae genera
Taxa named by Edward Meyrick